Chongqing–Guiyang railway is a major trunk higher-speed rail selected for construction under the 11th Five Year Plan set by the Chinese Government. Construction started on December 22, 2010, and opened on January 25, 2018.

Profile
Of this,  are within Chongqing and  within Guizhou Province. The total investment amounted to around 44.92 billion RMB. The design corresponds to national level I railway standards; the line is electrified and double-track. The main function of this railway is passenger, express freight, and container transport.

The line forms part of a larger network of railways such as the Chongqing–Lanzhou railway and the Guiyang–Guangzhou high-speed railway, fast becoming another important access route to the sea. Trains run from Chongqing to Guiyang in two hours and from Chongqing to Guangzhou in six hours. It improves the north–south movement of passengers and fast freight along the railway transport corridor while also relieving pressures and increasing capacities on existing conventional railway lines in the region. It is seen as a potential catalyst for economic development in several impoverished areas, especially in Guizhou, one of the poorest provinces of China.

The line forms part of the Baotou (Yinchuan)–Hainan corridor. A parallel Chongqing–Guiyang high-speed railway is planned in the medium or long term.

Route
Starting in Chongqing's Shapingba District at Chongqing West railway station, the line passes through Qijiang, Tongzi, Zunyi, and Xifeng and terminates at Guiyang North railway station.

The Chongqing–Guizhou railway follows a route generally similar to that of the older Sichuan–Guizhou railway, constructed in 1956–65; however due to the more extensive use of tunnels (145 of them), the new line is significantly shorter ( instead of ).

Stations
 Chongqing West
 Luohuang South, 
 Qijiang East, 
 Ganshui East,
 Tongzi North,
 Tongzi East, 
 Loushanguan South, 
 Zunyi, 
 Longkeng, 
 Zunyi South, 
 Xifeng, 
 Xiuwenxian,
 Guiyang North

References

High-speed railway lines in China
Rail transport in Guizhou
Rail transport in Chongqing
Railway lines opened in 2018